The Tarpon Springs Historic District is a U.S. historic district in Tarpon Springs, Florida. On December 6, 1990, it was added to the U.S. National Register of Historic Places.

See also
Tarpon Springs Depot

References

External links
Pinellas County listings at National Register of Historic Places

Tarpon Spring Historic District
Historic districts on the National Register of Historic Places in Florida
Tarpon Springs, Florida